Colexio de San Xerome (in Spanish Colegio de San Jerónimo) is a college in Santiago de Compostela, Province of A Coruña, Galicia, Spain. Founded in 1501, it is located on the Praza do Obradoiro.

References

Buildings and structures in Santiago de Compostela
Buildings and structures completed in 1501
Universities and colleges in Spain
1501 establishments in Spain